Dimitrios Ferfelis (born 5 April 1993) is a German-Greek footballer who plays as a forward for Atlas Delmenhorst.

Career 
Ferfelis started his career playing for TuS Koblenz in German Regionalliga. On 10 June 2014, signed a three-year contract with Greek Super League club PAS Giannina. On 29 December 2016, he transferred to PAS Lamia 1964.

References

External links
 

1993 births
Living people
German people of Greek descent
German footballers
Greek footballers
Association football forwards
TuS Koblenz players
PEC Zwolle players
PAS Giannina F.C. players
PAS Lamia 1964 players
FSV Zwickau players
Wormatia Worms players
FC Gießen players
Atlas Delmenhorst players
Regionalliga players
Eredivisie players
Super League Greece players
Football League (Greece) players
3. Liga players
German expatriate footballers
Greek expatriate footballers
Expatriate footballers in the Netherlands
Expatriate footballers in Greece
People from Delmenhorst
Footballers from Lower Saxony